Johnny Love (11 March 1937 – 19 November 2010) was an English footballer who played for Oxford United and Wellington Town. Love represented England twice at youth level. During his spell at Oxford, he played 279 league games. Between 1955 and 1957, Love was called up to the National Service in the West Indies. Love played on the left-wing during his years at Headington United and Oxford United.

References

External links
Rage Online profile

1937 births
2010 deaths
People from Eynsham
English footballers
Association football wingers
Oxford City F.C. players
Wolverhampton Wanderers F.C. players
Telford United F.C. players
Oxford United F.C. players
Southern Football League players
English Football League players